The 1983–84 South Pacific tropical cyclone season was a slightly below-average season.



Seasonal summary 

During November and December, no significant tropical cyclones developed in or moved into the South Pacific basin.

Systems

Tropical Cyclone Atu 

Tropical Cyclone Atu existed from December 27 to December 30.

Severe Tropical Cyclone Beti 

During 30 January, a shallow tropical low developed over the south-eastern Coral Sea. Over the next couple of days the system gradually developed further as it moved westwards into the South Pacific basin.

Tropical Cyclone Harvey 

During the next day, Harvey gradually weakened as it moved towards the southeast, before at 1800 UTC the JTWC and TCWC Nadi reported that Harvey had weakened below tropical cyclone intensity.

Unnamed Tropical Cyclone 

An unnamed tropical cyclone existed from February 20 to February 24.

Tropical Cyclone Cyril 

Over the next day the system moved south-eastwards, but there was no evidence of the system developing, with only small changes observed on successive satellite images. However, the system was named Cyril by the FMS during March 17, after a couple of satellite images, revealed more prominent cloud banding and a larger convective overcast around the systems centre. The system subsequently peaked with 10-minute sustained winds of 45 knots during the next day, before it started to accelerate south-eastwards and rapidly weaken. The system was last noted during March 21, while it was located about

Unnamed Tropical Cyclone 

Another unnamed tropical cyclone existed from March 23 to March 30.

Other systems 
During January 18, Tropical Cyclone Grace moved into the basin from the Australian region, where it lost its tropical characteristics and weakened below tropical cyclone intensity. The system subsequently moved westwards before it was last noted, to the south-east of New Caledonia during January 21.

Season effects 
This table lists all the storms that developed in the South Pacific basin during the 1983–84 season. It includes their intensity on the Australian Tropical cyclone intensity scale, duration, name, areas affected, deaths, and damages. 

|-
|  || December 27–30 || bgcolor=#| || bgcolor=#| || bgcolor=#| || || || ||
|-
|  || January 18 – 20, 1984 || bgcolor=#| || bgcolor=#||| bgcolor=#| || None || None || None ||
|-
|  || January 30 – February 5, 1984 || bgcolor=#| || bgcolor=#| || bgcolor=#| || New Caledonia || None || None ||
|-
|  || February 7–8 || bgcolor=#| || bgcolor=#| || bgcolor=#| || New Caledonia ||  None ||  None ||
|-
|  || February 20–24 || bgcolor=#| || bgcolor=#| || bgcolor=#| || None || None || None ||
|-
|  || March 16–21 || bgcolor=#| || bgcolor=#| || bgcolor=#| || Fiji || Minor || None ||
|-
|  || March 23–30 || bgcolor=#| || bgcolor=#| || bgcolor=#| || || || ||
|-

References

External links 

 
South Pacific cyclone seasons
Articles which contain graphical timelines
Tropical cyclones in 1983
Tropical cyclones in 1984